Christopher Walker may refer to:
 Christopher J. Walker (1942–2017), British historian
 Christopher Walker (athlete) (born 1968), Gibraltarian triathlete and cyclist
 Christopher "Kit" Walker, the real name of the comic book character The Phantom

See also
 Chris Walker (disambiguation)